Route 435 is a  long mostly North–South secondary highway in the northwest portion of New Brunswick, Canada.

The route's southern terminus starts at the northern bank of the Miramichi River on Route 425 in the community of Whitney. The road continues north through a mostly treed area before taking a sharp east turn where it passes through the community of Maple Glen. The road then continues north again through a mostly treed area ending at the intersection near the community of Chaplin Island Road.

History

Intersecting routes
None

See also

References

435
435